Pontcharra is a commune in the Isère department in southeastern France.

Population

Personalities
Pontcharra is the birthplace of former Formula One driver René Arnoux. Chevalier de Bayard, the legendary "knight without fear and without reproach", was born at the Château Bayard in Pontcharra.

Twin towns
Pontcharra is twinned with:

  Rovasenda, Italy, since 1973

See also 
 Communes of the Isère department
 Château Bayard
 Avalon, France

References

External links
Official site

Communes of Isère
Isère communes articles needing translation from French Wikipedia